The Swedish Film Database is an Internet database about Swedish films, published by the Swedish Film Institute. It contains information about all Swedish films from 1897 onwards and foreign films that had cinema premiere in Sweden. It also provides many biographies of actors, directors, producers etc. who participated in Swedish films over the years. It is created with the support of the Bank of Sweden Tercentenary Foundation. The database comprises about 62,000 films (17,000 Swedish films) and 265,000 people.

References

External links
Swedish Film Database

Swedish film websites
Online film databases
Databases in Sweden